The 2003–04 NCAA football bowl games were a series of 28 post-season games (including the Bowl Championship Series) played in December 2003 and January 2004 for Division I-A football teams and their all-stars. The post-season began with the New Orleans Bowl on December 16, 2003, and concluded on January 31, 2004, with the season-ending Gridiron Classic.

A total of 28 team-competitive games, and two all-star games, were played. To fill the 56 available bowl slots, four teams with non-winning seasons participated in bowl games—all four had a .500 (6–6) season.  While teams that did not have winning seasons were invited to bowl games, seven teams with winning records were left out: Northern Illinois (10–2); Connecticut (9-3); Marshall and Toledo (both 8–4);  Air Force and Akron (both 7–5); and South Florida (7–4).

Poll rankings
The below table lists top teams (per polls taken after the completion of the regular season and any conference championship games), their win–loss records (prior to bowl games), and the bowls they later played in. The AP column represents rankings per the AP Poll, while the BCS column represents the Bowl Championship Series rankings.

 denotes a BCS bowl game

Schedule

Conference bowl representation

All-star games

References

External links
2003–04 NCAA football bowl games